Keen of Hamar is a nature reserve on Unst, in Shetland, Scotland, managed by Scottish Natural Heritage. The reserve is primarily of botanical interest, for example for populations of Cerastium nigrescens, a plant unique to Unst.

Keen of Hamar was designated a special area of conservation on 17 March 2005.  It is also a site of special scientific interest.  The site is of outstanding interest for the interaction of plants with the thin, chromium metal-rich soil.

Scottish Natural Heritage provides further information on its SSSI site management statement.

The geological features at the site are a highlight of Geopark Shetland.

See also
Geology of Scotland
Hagdale Chromate Railway

References

External links
The Story of Keen of Hamar National Nature Reserve, Scotland's National Nature Reserves, Scottish Natural Heritage
The Reserve Plan for Keen of Hamar National Nature Reserve 2009 - 2015, Scotland's National Nature Reserves, Scottish Natural Heritage

Sites of Special Scientific Interest in Shetland
Protected areas of Shetland
Special Areas of Conservation in Scotland
Unst